Casey Clabough (pronounced "Clay-bo"), (January 31, 1974-January 1, 2023)was an American writer, farmer, and professor in the Etowah Valley Writers MFA at Reinhardt University.

Clabough was born in Richmond, Virginia, and raised primarily on a farm in Appomattox County, Virginia. However, he attributes his culture to the Appalachian roots of his family, who lived in the Smoky Mountains for over two hundred years and were one of the founding families of Gatlinburg, Tennessee. Clabough currently performs editorial work as series editor of the multi-volume "Best Creative Nonfiction of the South" (Texas Review Press), as executive editor of the James Dickey Review, and as literature section editor of the Encyclopedia Virginia.

Clabough has published over a hundred works in anthologies and periodicals, including the Sewanee Review, Virginia Quarterly Review, and Creative Nonfiction.

From 2016, Clabough suffered from schizophrenia. He died on January 1, 2023.

Education

College of William and Mary (BA)
University of South Carolina (PHD)

Books
The End of the Mountains (Little Curlew, 2016)
Women of War: Memoirs, Poems, and Fiction By Virginia Women Who Lived Through the Civil War (Texas Review Press, 2014)
Idiot's Guides: Creative Writing(Penguin, 2014)
SCHOOLED: Life Lessons of a College Professor (Belvedere, 2013)
George Garrett: A Biography (Texas Review Press, 2013)
Inhabiting Contemporary Southern and Appalachian Literature: Region and Place in the Twenty-First Century (University Press of Florida, 2012)
Confederado: A Novel of the Americas (Ingalls/High Mountain, 2012)
The Art of the Magic Striptease: The Literary Layers of George Garrett (University Press of Florida, 2008)
Gayl Jones: The Language of Voice and Freedom in Her Writings (McFarland, 2008)
The Warrior's Path: Reflections Along an Ancient Route (University of Tennessee Press, 2007)
Experimentation and Versatility: The Early Novels and Short Fiction of Fred Chappell (Mercer University Press, 2005)
Elements: The Novels of James Dickey (Mercer University Press, 2005)

References 

"Casey Clabough," The Writers Directory (Gale, 2011) (biographical entry with list of publications)
"Casey Clabough" Contemporary Authors (Thomson/Gale, 2007) (biographical entry and interview)

External links
Clabough's author website
Vitae
Research Interests
GoodReads.com website for author
Clabough's faculty website
Feature on Clabough in the Oxford American
 Review of Confederado in Blackbird
Poets & Writers directory listing
"Casey Clabough," The Writers Directory (Gale, 2011) (biographical entry with list of publications)
"Casey Clabough" Contemporary Authors (Thomson/Gale, 2007) (biographical entry and interview)
The Warrior's Path: Reflections along an Ancient Route," By J.D. Schraffenberger in Interdisciplinary Studies in Literature and Environment 15.2 (Summer 2008), Association for the Study of Literature and Environment (review)
"LC Professor Hikes the Trail of His Ancestors" in Lynchburg News & Advance (November 12, 2007): B4 (newspaper article on Clabough and his writing)
"Story of 'Confederados' inspires writer", By Alicia Petska in Lynchburg News & Advance (August 20, 2012), (interview and photograph reprinted by The Daily Progress)
Memoir Review
Biography Review
Confederados in Brazil

People from Appomattox, Virginia
1974 births
Living people